Solanum douglasii is a species of plant in the family Solanaceae known by the common name greenspot nightshade.

It is native to the northern half of Mexico and the southwestern south-central United States. Its habitat includes scrub and woodland.

Description
Solanum douglasii is a perennial herb or subshrub approaching two meters in maximum height. The stem is coated in short, white hairs. The leaves may be up to 9 centimeters long and have smooth or toothed edges.

The inflorescence is an umbel-shaped array of flowers with star-shaped white corollas up to a centimeter wide. There are generally green spots at the bases of the corolla lobes. The yellow anthers are a few millimeters in length. Flowers may be seen blooming throughout much of the year.

The fruit is a spherical berry up to a centimeter wide.

Uses
Native Americans used the juice of the berries medicinally, and the Luiseño used it as dye for tattooing.

References

External links
Photo gallery

douglasii
Flora of California
Flora of Arizona
Flora of Baja California
Flora of Louisiana
Flora of New Mexico
Flora of Texas
Flora of the California desert regions
Natural history of the California chaparral and woodlands
Natural history of the California Coast Ranges
Natural history of the Channel Islands of California
Natural history of the Peninsular Ranges
Natural history of the San Francisco Bay Area
Natural history of the Santa Monica Mountains
Natural history of the Transverse Ranges
Plants described in 1852
Flora without expected TNC conservation status